Adrián Butzke Benavides (born 30 March 1999) is a Spanish professional footballer who plays as a forward for Portuguese club F.C. Paços de Ferreira, on loan from Granada CF.

Club career
Born in Monachil, Granada, Andalusia to a German father and a Spanish mother, Butzke joined Granada CF's youth setup from hometown side CA Monachil. In July 2018, after finishing his formation, he was assigned to farm team CD Huétor Vega in Tercera División.

Butzke made his senior debut on 26 August 2018, starting in a 0–2 home loss against Atlético Mancha Real. He first appeared with the reserves on 2 September, coming on as a late substitute for Eliseo Falcón in a 0–1 Segunda División B home loss against UCAM Murcia CF.

Butzke scored his first senior goal on 11 November 2018, netting Huétor Vega's second in a 4–3 away win over Martos CD. The following July, after scoring nine goals for the farm team, he was definitely promoted to the B-side.

On 29 June 2020, Butzke renewed his contract with the Nazaríes until 2022. On 4 September, however, he was loaned to fellow third-tier side Haro Deportivo for the campaign.

Upon returning in July 2021, Butzke was again a member of Granada B, with the side now in the Segunda División RFEF. He made his first-team debut on 30 November, starting and scoring a hat-trick in a 7–0 away routing of CD Laguna de Tenerife in the season's Copa del Rey.

Butzke made his professional – and La Liga – debut on 19 December 2021, replacing goalscorer Jorge Molina in a 4–1 home routing of RCD Mallorca. The following 14 January, he renewed his contract until 2026, and moved on loan to Primeira Liga side F.C. Paços de Ferreira late in the month.

On 24 August 2022, after spending the entire pre-season with Granada, Butzke returned to Paços on a one-year loan deal.

References

External links

1999 births
Living people
Sportspeople from the Province of Granada
Spanish footballers
Spanish people of German descent
Footballers from Andalusia
Association football forwards
La Liga players
Segunda División B players
Segunda Federación players
Tercera División players
Primeira Liga players
CD Huétor Vega players
Club Recreativo Granada players
Haro Deportivo players
Granada CF footballers
F.C. Paços de Ferreira players
Spanish expatriate footballers
Spanish expatriate sportspeople in Portugal
Expatriate footballers in Portugal